Viereck is a municipality in the Vorpommern-Greifswald district, in Mecklenburg-Vorpommern, Germany.

History
Viereck was founded in 1748 in the course of the repopulation policy under King Frederick II, the Great, of Prussia. The then competent Prussian state minister in charge of internal colonisation, became namesake to the place, when it was renamed in his honour in 1751.

References

Vorpommern-Greifswald
1748 establishments in Prussia